James Burnie Beck (February 13, 1822May 3, 1890) was a Scottish-American slave owner, white supremacist, and United States Representative and Senator from Kentucky.

Life
Born in Dumfriesshire, Scotland, Beck migrated to the United States in 1838 and settled in Wyoming County, New York. He moved to Lexington, Kentucky in 1843 and graduated from Transylvania University in 1846. Beck was admitted to the bar and commenced the practice of law in Lexington. Until shortly before the Civil War, he was law partner of John C. Breckinridge, the U.S. Vice President who became a Confederate general; during the Civil War, Beck was interrogated by a military commission about his knowledge of his former partner's activities.

After the war Beck was elected as a Democrat to the United States House of Representatives serving Kentucky's district 7. He was appointed to the Select Committee on Reconstruction where it was expected that as a newcomer and an immigrant he would be no obstacle to Republican intentions, but he immediately became a tenacious advocate of the rights of the defeated states. A White supremacist, he opposed civil rights for African Americans. He was elected to the Fortieth and to the three succeeding Congresses, serving in all from March 4, 1867 to March 3, 1875.

In 1876, Beck was appointed a member of the commission to define the boundary line between Maryland and Virginia. He was then elected to the United States Senate in 1876, being reelected twice and serving in all from March 4, 1877, until his death in Washington, D.C., on May 3, 1890. Longtime Washington journalist Benjamin Perley Poore described Beck during his time in the Senate as "a stalwart, farmer-like looking man, with that overcharged brain which made his tongue at times falter because he could not utter what his furious, fiery eloquence prompted." While in the Senate, Beck was the Democratic Conference Chairman from 1885 to 1890, and the chairman of the Committee on Transportation Routes to the Seaboard. He was prominent in the discussion of tariff and currency questions.

He is interred at Lexington Cemetery. His son, George T. Beck, was a noted politician and entrepreneur in the state of Wyoming.

See also
List of United States senators born outside the United States
List of United States Congress members who died in office (1790–1899)

Notes

References

 U.S. Congress. Memorial Addresses for James Beck. 51st Cong., 2nd sess. from 1890 to 1891. Washington, D.C.: Government Printing Office, 1891.

|-

|-

|-

1822 births
1890 deaths
19th-century American politicians
British emigrants to the United States
Democratic Party members of the United States House of Representatives from Kentucky
Democratic Party United States senators from Kentucky
Kentucky lawyers
People from Dumfries and Galloway
People from Wyoming County, New York
Transylvania University alumni
19th-century American lawyers